Daher is an area in the south of Kuwait City, in Al Ahmadi Governorate, Kuwait.

Districts of Al Ahmadi Governorate